Arviat North-Whale Cove (Inuinnaqtun: Arviat Tununga-Tikiraryuaq) is a territorial electoral district (riding) for the Legislative Assembly of Nunavut, Canada.

The riding consists of part of the community of Arviat and Whale Cove. The district was created prior to the 28 October 2013 general election. The communities were previously in Arviat and Rankin Inlet South/Whale Cove.

Election results

2017 election

2013 election

References

Electoral districts of Kivalliq Region
2013 establishments in Nunavut